The Fox is a public house in Palmers Green, north London, on the corner of Green Lanes and Fox Lane. A Fox pub and hotel has stood on the site for over 300 years. In 2004, The Fox featured in the film of J.K. Rowling's novel Harry Potter and the Prisoner of Azkaban. In 2015, The Fox was the first Asset of Community Value to be registered in the London Borough of Enfield.

History
The first mention of The Fox is in 1682. The Society of Tradesmen and Labourers (1794-1825) met there.

Before the advent of the motor car, the Fox was the terminus of the horse-drawn bus service into London, run by the Davey family of publicans. The building formerly had stables at the back. The present building was constructed in 1904.

In 2002, a dispute between rival Albanian drugs gangs at The Fox spilled out on to the streets of Palmers Green and two men were critically injured and a third man, Edmund Gullhaj (22), was pronounced dead at the scene.

The Fox featured in the film of J.K. Rowling's novel Harry Potter and the Prisoner of Azkaban (2004).

In 2015, the pub became the London Borough of Enfield's first Asset of Community Value after a successful application by Southgate Civic District Trust. The Wonder public house in Enfield Town is similarly recognised. In 2017, it was reported that Dutch brewers Heineken owned the pub and were preparing plans to redevelop it.

See also
 List of pubs in London

References

External links 

Pubs in the London Borough of Enfield
Buildings and structures completed in 1904
Palmers Green
Assets of community value